Veiko Siimar (born 6 December 1941) is an Estonian swimmer. He competed in the men's 100 metre backstroke at the 1960 Summer Olympics for the Soviet Union.

References

External links
 

1941 births
Living people
Estonian male backstroke swimmers
Olympic swimmers of the Soviet Union
Swimmers at the 1960 Summer Olympics
Sportspeople from Tartu
Soviet male swimmers